William Norton Bailey (born Gardner Warren Reineck; September 26, 1886 – November 8, 1962) was an American actor and director.

Personal life
William Norton Bailey was born Gardner Warren Reineck on 26 September 1886 in Omaha, Nebraska. His parents, Rebecca Gardener Phillips and Jesse P. Reineck, his father was a Western Union telegraph operator. The family moved around the country based on Jesse’s work. The Reineck’s divorced after 1900 when Jesse was arrested, along with five other telegraph operators, for defrauding American Express. William's mother settled the family for a number of years in Milwaukee.

Bailey was married on 1917 in Philadelphia to Mary Cannon, an actress who worked under the professional names of Polly Vann and Mary/Polly Bailey. They had no children. After their marriage, William, his new wife, and his mother moved to New York City where he was a director at Vitagraph Studios. After her death in 1952, he married a second time to Mrs. Aletha Hamilton Fadden in Los Angeles. They died within a few months of each other and are buried at the Holy Cross Cemetery in Culver City, California.

Film career
Bailey's initial work in motion pictures came with Cosmopolitan Pictures, for which he directed one-reel and two-reel films. Bailey appeared in more than 300 films between 1911 and 1959, but his roles were often uncredited. Bailey also starred in the original cast of No, No Nanette (1925), a smash hit on Broadway. Born in Omaha, Nebraska, Bailey died in Hollywood, California in 1962 at the age of 76.

Selected filmography

References

External links

1886 births
1962 deaths
Male actors from Nebraska
American male film actors
American male silent film actors
American male stage actors
American male television actors
20th-century American male actors